Sir James McCulloch,  (18 March 1819 – 31 January 1893), British colonial politician, was the fifth Premier of Victoria.

Early life
McCulloch was born in Glasgow, Lanarkshire, Scotland. He was the son of George McCulloch, a quarry master and contractor, and Jane Thomson, a farmer's daughter. He had only a primary education and as a young man worked in shops, eventually becoming a junior partner in a softgoods firm. On 11 May 1853 McCulloch arrived in Melbourne aboard the Adelaide (John Everard being a fellow passenger) to manage the mercantile firm of Dennistoun Brothers in Melbourne. Following closure of the Dennistoun office in 1861, James McCulloch started his own business McCulloch, Sellar and Company in partnership with fellow Scot Robert Sellar. In the boom conditions following the Victorian Gold Rush, he soon became a wealthy man and a director of several banks and other companies. He was President of the Chamber of Commerce 1856–1857 and 1862–1863.

Political career
McCulloch was appointed a member of the Legislative Council on 1 August 1854, replacing Andrew Aldcorn. When Victoria gained responsible government in 1856, he was elected to the Legislative Assembly for Wimmera, which he represented from November 1856 to around August 1859, when he shifted to East Melbourne from October 1859. He later represented Mornington from March 1862 to around March 1872 and Warrnambool from May 1874 to around May 1878.

The historian Raymond Wright describes McCulloch as a "cautious liberal." He served as Commissioner for Trade and Customs 1857–58 under William Haines and as Treasurer 27 October 1859 to 26 November 1860 under William Nicholson. When John O'Shanassy's conservative government resigned in June 1863 McCulloch became Premier and Chief Secretary for the first time. He was also Postmaster-General of Victoria 9 May 1864 to 6 May 1868.

McCulloch's liberal government was the strongest Victoria had yet seen and proved to be the longest-lived so far, surviving for nearly five years. Much of its reforming zeal came from the Attorney-General, George Higinbotham, a crusading radical. The McCulloch government fought a series of battles with the conservative landowners who dominated the Legislative Council. The most important was over the tariff issue: McCulloch was a protectionist while the Council was controlled by free traders.

In 1865, the Council sought a confrontation with the Assembly by rejecting the government's tariff bill and then denying supply to McCulloch's government. McCulloch, who was a director of the London Bank, then took the extraordinary step of lending his own government 860,000 pounds to meet its debts and running expenses. After a conference between the two Houses broke down, McCulloch called an election in February 1866, at which his supporters won a large majority in the Assembly. When the Council again rejected his tariff bill, he resigned, leaving the Governor, Charles Darling, unable to find anyone else who could form a government. Finally, after prolonged negotiations, McCulloch agreed to resume office and the Council passed a modified tariff bill and granted supply. Both sides claimed victory, but most of the concessions were made by the Council.

In 1867 another crisis blew up when the Council again rejected the government's budget because it contained a clause granting a pension to the retiring Governor Darling, which conservatives said was a payment for his collusion in McCulloch's unorthodox methods of financing the government. McCulloch called another election for February 1868, which he won comfortably. But in May word came that the Colonial Secretary in London, the Duke of Buckingham, had instructed the new Governor, Sir John Manners-Sutton, to support the Council in blocking the grant to Darling.

McCulloch at once resigned, and the Governor commissioned a conservative member of the Council, Charles Sladen, to form a government which did not have a majority in the Assembly. This negation of democracy provoked widespread protests and produced a dangerous situation, which was resolved only in July when the Colonial Office changed its mind about Darling's pension and the Council agreed to a moderate reform bill broadening its electoral base. McCulloch resumed office, but without Higinbotham, who disapproved of this compromise.

McCulloch remained in office until September 1869, and was Premier again from 9 April 1870 to 19 June 1871 and from 20 October 1875 to 21 May 1877, but these periods in office were relatively uneventful. His main achievement in this period was to pass a bill abolishing all government funding to religious schools, a measure which was supported by all denominations except the Anglicans since it freed church schools from government supervision. McCulloch's government also introduced a bill to create a system of free, secular government schools, but the Catholics and Anglicans joined forces to block it.

McCulloch grew increasingly conservative after 1870 and in 1875 he had a political falling out with Higinbotham. Tired and disillusioned, he resigned from Parliament in 1878.

Late life and legacy
After politics, McCulloch focussed on business life, he had several directorships including the Bank of New South Wales.
McCulloch was knighted in 1870 and made KCMG in 1874. In 1886, he retired to England, and died in Epsom, Surrey on 31 January 1893; he is buried in the Glasgow Necropolis. He married first Susan Renwick and second Margaret Boak Inglis, but had no children.

Family
A young cousin, George McCulloch, was manager of the Mount Gipps sheep run for McCulloch, Sellar and Co. This country was later the site of the fabulous silver mines of Broken Hill and Silverton, and by good fortune George was one of the original investors and became wealthy from its discovery.

See also
Colonial liberalism

Sources
Geoff Browne, A Biographical Register of the Victorian Parliament, 1900–84, Government Printer, Melbourne, 1985
Don Garden, Victoria: A History, Thomas Nelson, Melbourne, 1984
Kathleen Thompson and Geoffrey Serle, A Biographical Register of the Victorian Parliament, 1856–1900, Australian National University Press, Canberra, 1972
 Raymond Wright, A People's Counsel. A History of the Parliament of Victoria, 1856–1990, Oxford University Press, Melbourne, 1992

References

 

1819 births
1893 deaths
Australian Knights Commander of the Order of St Michael and St George
Premiers of Victoria
Members of the Victorian Legislative Council
Members of the Victorian Legislative Assembly
Treasurers of Victoria 
Politicians from Glasgow
Agents-General for Victoria
19th-century Australian politicians
Burials at the Glasgow Necropolis
Scottish emigrants to colonial Australia
19th-century Australian businesspeople